

Education

Colleges

Art College
 Raja Ravi Varma College of Fine Arts, Mavelikkara

B.ed College
 Peet Memorial Training College, Mavelikkara

Engineering Colleges
 Archana College of Engineering, Nooranad.
Sree Buddha College of Engineering.
 Sri Vellapally Natesan College Of Engineering, Pallickal.

General Colleges
 Bishop Moore College, Kallumala, Mavelikkara
 College of Applied Sciences (IHRD), Mavelikkara
 Mar Ivanios College, Kallumala, Mavelikara
 Peet Memorial Training College, Mavelikkara

Schools
 Govt. Higher Secondary School, Kunnam
 Govt. Boys' Higher Secondary School, Mavelikkara
 Govt. Girls' Higher Secondary School, Mavelikkara 
 Govt. L.p &U.P. Kannamangalam South
 Vijnana Vilasini Higher Secondary School, Thamarakulam
 St John's High School, Mattom
 Sree Sai Public School, Kochalummoodu 
 Bishop Moore Vidyapith, Kallumala, Mavelikkara
 Bishop Hodges Higher Secondary School, Mavelikkara
 Seventh Day Adventist English Medium High School, Mavelikkara
 Infant Jesus ISC School, Mavelikkara
 St. Mary's Cathedral Public School, Puthiyakavu
 M.S.S High School, Thazhakara
 A.V.Sanskrit U.P. School, Thazhakara
 St John's English Medium School, Mattom
 Higher Secondary and Training School, Kaitha North, Chettikulangara
 Govt. V.H.S.S. Chunakara
 N.S.S.U.P.S. Chunakara
 Sree Buddha Central School, Pattoor, Padanilam
 Sree Narayana Central School, Cherukunnam, Mavelikkara
 St Mary's Cathedral Public School Puthiyacavu, Mavelikara
 Crossland Public School, Kunnam
 S.V.L.P School, Thazhakara.
 Vidhyadhiraja Vidya Peetom Central School, Ponnaramthottam
 Vidyadhiraja Vidyapeedom L.P. School
 Vijnana Santhayani Sanskrit High School, Koypallikaranma
 Thekekkara Government U.P. School
 TMVMHS, Vettiyar
 Pope Pius XI Higher Secondary School, Kattanam
 Govt. Higher Secondary School, Chettikulangara
 TTI School
 Mahatma Higher Secondary School for Boys, Chennithala
 Mahatma Higher Secondary School for Girls, Chennithala
 Jawahar Navodaya Vidyalaya, Chennithala.
 Cherupushpa Central School, Chunakkar
 St John's M.S.C.U.P.School, Kurathikad (Pallickal East)
 Amala L.P. School, Erezha
 Vathikulam L.P. School
 Mar Ivanious School, Kallumala
 CNPPM Vocational HS, Kattachira
 NSS High School, Kurathikad
 Govt. L.P. School, Kurathikad
 S.N. Central School, Cherukunnam.
 A.G.R.M.H.S.S, Vallikunnam
 Govt. U.P. School, Varenickal
 A.O.M.M. L.P. School
 Vikram Sarabhai I.T.E.
 St Mary's Central School, Vettiyar
 Erezha U.P. School, Chettikulangara
 Govt. U.P. School, Kandiyoor
 K.K.M. Govt. V.H.S.S, Elippakulam
 Govt L.P.S, Elippakulam
 Padanilam H.S.S., Nooranad
 Little Kingdom Junior School West Fort, Mavelikara

Education in Alappuzha district